Diet for a New America is a 1987 bestselling nonfiction book by John Robbins. The book links the impacts of factory farming on human health, animal welfare and the environment, in an "animal-rights, pro-environment, vegetarian message." It was nominated for the Pulitzer Prize for Non-Fiction in 1987.

In 1991 KCET, the Los Angeles PBS affiliate, produced a film documentary based on the book called Diet for a New America: Your Health, Your Planet. The film is narrated by John Robbins and features interviews with Michael Klaper, T. Colin Campbell, and John A. McDougall.

Critical reception
Colman McCarthy and Cleveland Amory compared the book to Rachel Carson's Silent Spring. In an editorial for The Washington Post and Finger Lakes Times McCarthy writes: "Robbins has written a book that is the pioneering match of Aldo Leopold's Sand County Almanac, John Rawls' A Theory of Justice, and Rachel Carson's Silent Spring."

Marian Burros of The New York Times writes: "Much of what Mr. Robbins has to say about diet in this country is unremarkable: we eat too much meat and dairy products. Much of what Mr. Robbins has to say about the inhumane treatment of animals on factory farms is correct. But Mr. Robbins undermines his case by exaggerating; facts mix with factoids and anecdotes."

In 1990, the Phil Donahue Show featured celebrities and John Robbins talking about vegetarianism and Diet for a New America.

Influence 
In 1988, Robbins founded EarthSave, a non-profit organization promoting vegetarianism. Its purpose was to channel into action the overwhelmingly positive reader response to Diet for a New America. At its height in the early 1990s, there were perhaps 10 chapters across the United States that did outreach to the non-vegetarian public, with information tables and vegetarian social activities, and activism on vegetarian, animal, and food system issues.

The book and the documentary film based on the book have influenced many people to adopt a vegetarian or vegan diet. People who have said the book or film influenced them include Emily Deschanel, Davey Havok, Avery Yale Kamila, Russell Simmons, and Weird Al Yankovic.

Editions 
In 2012, a 25th anniversary edition of the book was released in paperback, audiobook, and electronic formats.

See also
 List of vegan media

References

External links 
 Diet for a New America: Your Health, Your Planet (1991) – Film documentary at Internet Archive
 

1987 non-fiction books
Baskin-Robbins family
Books about animal rights
Books about veganism
Books about vegetarianism
Dieting books
Environmental non-fiction books
Food and drink in the United States
Vegetarian-related mass media
Vegetarianism in the United States